German pop rock band Silbermond has released six studio albums, one compilation albums, and twenty singles (including two as a featured artist). In 2004, their record company Sony BMG requested the quartet to record and release skate punk song "Mach's dir selbst" as their debut single; the song underperformed on the charts. Months later, second single "Durch die Nacht" became a top twenty hit on the German Singles Chart and prompted the label to release Silbermond's debut album Verschwende deine Zeit (2004). A major success, it reached the top five in Austria and Germany, where it was certified platinum and 7× gold, respectively. Ballad "Symphonie", the album's third single, became the group's first top five hit.

Laut gedacht, the group's second album, was released in April 2006. As with "Das Beste", the album's third single and Silbermond's first number-one hit, it reached the top of the charts in Austria and Germany and was eventually certified 3× platinum by the Bundesverband Musikindustrie (BVMI). In Switzerland, it peaked at number three. Third album Nichts passiert, released in March 2009, debuted atop the Austrian, German, and Swiss Albums Charts. It produced three singles, including "Irgendwas bleibt", Silbermond's second number-one hit, and "Krieger des Lichts", which reached the top ten in Germany.

In 2012, fourth studio album Himmel auf was released. A top three success, it was reached gold status in Austria and 3× gold status in Germany. Its same-titled debut single peaked within the top five in Germany. In 2014, Alles auf Anfang 2014–04, Silbermond's first compilation was released. It reached the top ten in Austria and Switzerland and was certified gold by the BVMI. The same year, the band collaborated with Band Aid 30 Germany on a remake of "Do They Know It's Christmas?", which became another number-one hit in Germany. Leichtes Gepäck, the group's fifth album, was released in November 2015. Recorded in Nashville, it reached the top five in Germany and Switzerland.

Albums

Studio albums

Compilation albums

Singles

As lead artist

As featured artist

References

External links
 

Discographies of German artists